This is a list of Breaking the Magician's Code: Magic's Biggest Secrets Finally Revealed episodes.

The original specials
* Denotes illusions only shown on the VHS release.

2002 special

2008 series revival

Australian version

References

http://www.nashentertainment.com/television/magic/episodes.html

Lists of non-fiction television series episodes